Sergei Prokofiev's String Quartet No. 1 in B minor, Op. 50 (1931) was commissioned by the Library of Congress.  The Quartet was first performed in Washington, D. C. on 25 April 1931 by the Brosa Quartet and in Moscow on 9 October 1931 by the Roth Quartet. The string quartet is in three movements, lasting around 20–25 minutes.

Movements
Allegro
Andante molto
Andante

Analysis
The work is distinctive in that its key, B minor, is just a semitone below the limits of the viola and cello range. Another distinctive feature is that the finale is a slow movement, which is highly intense in emotion and full of sweeping melodies.

Prokofiev had liked the finale so much that he transcribed a version of it for string orchestra, as Op. 50a, and included a piano transcription in his pieces as Op. 52.

See also
Prokofiev - String Quartet No. 2 in F major
Prokofiev - Chamber Music
Prokofiev - List of Compositions

References

External links

Video - Prokofiev String Quartet No 1 - Complete (23:14).
Prokofiev String Quartet No 1 in B minor, Opus 50 (1931).
Video - Prokofiev String Quartet No 1 mvt 1/audio (07:20) Allegro.
Video - Prokofiev String Quartet No 1 mvt 2/audio (07:10) Andante molto.
Video - Prokofiev String Quartet No 1 mvt 3/audio (08:40) Andante.

Chamber music by Sergei Prokofiev
Prokofiev 1
20th-century classical music
1931 compositions
Compositions in B minor